Major Asaram Tyagi, MVC was a hero of the Battle of Dograi in the Indo-Pakistani War of 1965.

On the night of 21 September 1965, Major Asa Ram Tyagi personally led the leading platoon of a company of 3rd Jat Battalion of Indian Army to capture a Pakistani position in Dograi village in Pakistan, which was defended by a troop of tanks, covering pillboxes and recoilless guns. While assaulting the position, Major Tyagi was hit by two bullets in the right shoulder. In spite of his injury, he pressed on against the tanks, personally destroyed the crew with grenades and captured two tanks intact. In this process he was again hit by three more bullets, but still continued to lead his company until he fell unconscious.

He was subsequently evacuated to a military hospital where he died. Greatly inspired by his conspicuous bravery, his men captured the objective.

Memorial songs
Many songs in memory of the Battle of Dograi remain popular in Haryana. One of them narrates the battle in these words:
Kahe suney ki baat na bolun ankho dekhi bhai,
Teen Jaat ki katha sunaun sun le mere bhai,
Paanch Sitambar raat ghaneri hamla Jaton ne maari,
Dusman me much gayi khalbali kaanp uthi Dograi.

Military recognition
For displaying exceptional gallantry for the nation Major Asharam Tyagi was decorated with Maha Vir Chakra, posthumously.

References

Indian military personnel killed in action
Recipients of the Maha Vir Chakra
1965 deaths
Indian Army personnel
1939 births